The 7.62 TKIV 85, short for 7.62 Tarkkuuskivääri 85 (7.62 sniper rifle 85) is a sniper rifle used by the Finnish Defence Forces.

It is based on the Mosin–Nagant rifle, using the same (in some cases antique) receivers. The Finnish Army has produced such rifles since the nation was founded.

The Mosin–Nagant bolt-action rifles were modified in 1984 by Valmet who also manufactured new barrels for these rifles. The rifles were assembled in 1984–1985 by Finnish Defence Forces (FDF) Asevarikko 1 ("Arsenal 1") in Kuopio, Finland.

Though the 7.62 TKIV 85 sniper rifle has been modified extensively compared to the standard Mosin–Nagant rifle, the use of the old receivers in these rifles makes them arguably the oldest small arms in current use by any military. Some of the parts used may date back as far as the 1890s.

Another exclusive feature of the 7.62 TKIV 85 is its 7.62×53mmR chambering. No other currently used military firearm is chambered for this unique Finnish cartridge. The PKM machine guns and other Russian firearms in Finnish service are chambered for the 7.62×54mmR cartridge. The standard operating procedure calls for the use of 7.62×54mmR cartridges in 7.62 TKIV 85 rifles only in emergency situations when 7.62×53mmR ammunition is not available. The reason for this is the bullet diameter difference of 7.85 mm (0.309 in) in the 7.62×53mmR versus 7.92 mm (0.312 in) in the 7.62×54mmR. Some 7.62×53mmR rounds were also loaded with an intermediate 7.88 mm (0.310 in) diameter bullet.

On 25 May 2020, SAKO and Finnish Defence Forces signed a letter of intent regarding research and development of a family of rifles to replace the Tkiv 85 and Dragunov rifles.

References

External links

Finnish Defence Forces website
Finnish website with images of 7.62 TKIV 85 rifles

7.62×53mmR rifles
Bolt-action rifles of Finland
Sniper rifles of Finland
Designated marksman rifles
Military equipment introduced in the 1980s